David Lyons may refer to:
David Lyons (actor) (born 1976), Australian actor
David Lyons (rugby union, born 1980), Australian rugby union player
David Lyons (rugby union, born 1985), English rugby union player
David Lyons (philosopher) (born 1935), professor of philosophy and law at Boston University
David Lyons (swimmer) (born 1943), American swimmer

See also
David Lyon (disambiguation)
Lyons (surname)